Novoselitba is a rural locality (a selo) in Nekrasovsky Selsoviet of Belogorsky District, Amur Oblast, Russia. The population was 20 as of 2018. There is 1 street.

Geography 
Novoselitba is located on the right bank of the Belaya River, 50 km south of Belogorsk (the district's administrative centre) by road. Nikolayevka is the nearest rural locality.

References 

Rural localities in Belogorsky District